North of the Border may refer to:

In film and television:

 North of the Border (film), a 1946 film by B. Reeves Eason

As a colloquialism:

 Scotland, in England and Wales
 Canada, in the United States
 United States, in Mexico

See also 

 South of the Border (disambiguation)